Agrilus viridis (beech splendour beetle) is a wood-boring beetle. It belongs to the jewel beetle family, Buprestidae.

Widely found in Europe, its larvae eat the wood of living trees — the favourite host plants are goat willow (Salix caprea), beech (Fagus) and birch (Betula), but they will inhabit a number of deciduous tree species. Occasionally the beetle may become a pest in horticulture or forestry.

References

External links

viridis
Woodboring beetles
Beetles described in 1758
Taxa named by Carl Linnaeus